"I Just Had to Hear Your Voice" is a song by American singer Oleta Adams. The single earned Adams a Soul Train nomination for R&B Single of the Year, Female in 1994.

Charts

References

1993 singles
1993 songs
Fontana Records singles
Songs written by Jud Friedman